Saint-Martin-de-Brômes (Provençal Occitan: Sant Martin de Bromes) is a commune in the southwestern part of the Alpes-de-Haute-Provence department in the Provence-Alpes-Côte d'Azur region in Southeastern France. It is on the left bank of the Verdon River, which marks the departmental border with Var. As of 2019, Saint-Martin-de-Brômes had a population of 627.

Demographics

See also
 Coteaux de Pierrevert AOC
Communes of the Alpes-de-Haute-Provence department

References

Communes of Alpes-de-Haute-Provence
Alpes-de-Haute-Provence communes articles needing translation from French Wikipedia